A spirochaete or spirochete is a member of the phylum Spirochaetota, (synonym Spirochaetes)  which contains distinctive diderm (double-membrane) gram-negative bacteria, most of which have long, helically coiled (corkscrew-shaped or spiraled, hence the name) cells. Spirochaetes are chemoheterotrophic in nature, with lengths between 3 and 500 μm and diameters around 0.09 to at least 3 μm.

Spirochaetes are distinguished from other bacterial phyla by the location of their flagella, called endoflagella which are  sometimes called axial filaments. Endoflagella are anchored at each end (pole) of the bacterium within the periplasmic space (between the inner and outer membranes) where they project backwards to extend the length of the cell. These cause a twisting motion which allows the spirochaete to move about. When reproducing, a spirochaete will undergo asexual transverse binary fission. Most spirochaetes are free-living and anaerobic, but there are numerous exceptions. Spirochaete bacteria are diverse in their pathogenic capacity and the ecological niches that they inhabit, as well as molecular characteristics including guanine-cytosine content and genome size.

Pathogenicity
Many organisms within the Spirochaetota phylum cause prevalent diseases. Pathogenic members of this phylum include the following:

 Leptospira species, which causes leptospirosis
 Borrelia burgdorferi, B. mayonii, B. bissettiae, B. garinii, B. afzelii, B. spielmanii, B. lusitaniae, which cause Lyme disease. 
 Borrelia recurrentis, which causes relapsing fever
 Treponema pallidum subspecies which cause treponematoses such as syphilis and yaws. 
  Brachyspira pilosicoli and Brachyspira aalborgi, which cause intestinal spirochaetosis

Salvarsan, the first partially organic synthetic antimicrobial drug in medical history, was effective against spirochaetes and primarily used to cure syphilis.  Additionally, oral spirochaetes are known to play a significant role in the pathogenesis of human periodontal disease.

Taxonomy and molecular signatures
The class currently consists of 14 validly named genera across 4 orders and 5 families. The orders Brachyspirales, Brevinematales and Leptospirales each contain a single family, Brachyspiraceae, Brevinemataceae and Leptospiraceae, respectively. The Spirochaetales order harbours two families, Spirochaetaceae and Borreliaceae. Molecular markers in the form of conserved signature indels (CSIs) and CSPs have been found specific for each of the orders, with the exception of Brevinimetales, that provide a reliable means to demarcate these clades from one another within the diverse phylum. Additional CSIs have been found exclusively shared by each family within the Spirochaetales. These molecular markers are in agreement with the observed phylogenetic tree branching of two monophyletic clades within the Spirochaetales order. CSIs have also been found that further differentiate taxonomic groups within the Borreliaceae family that further delineate evolutionary relationships that are in accordance with physical characteristics such as pathogenicity (viz. Borrelia emend. Borreliella gen. nov.). However, this study has been criticized, and other studies using different approaches do not support the proposed split. The new naming system for the Lyme and relapsing fever Borrelia has not been adopted by the scientific literature.

A CSI has also been found exclusively shared by all Spirochaetota species. This CSI is a 3 amino acid insert in the flagellar basal body rod protein FlgC which is an important part of the unique endoflagellar structure shared by Spirochaetota species. Given that the CSI is exclusively shared by members within this phylum, it has been postulated that it may be related to the characteristic flagellar properties observed among Spirochaetota species.

Historically, all families belonging to the Spirochaetota phylum were assigned to a single order, the Spirochaetales. However, the current taxonomic view is more connotative of accurate evolutionary relationships.  The distribution of a CSI is indicative of shared ancestry within the clade for which it is specific.  It thus functions as a synapomorphic characteristic, so that the distributions of different CSIs provide the means to identify different orders and families within the phylum and so justify the phylogenetic divisions.

Phylogeny

Taxonomy
The currently accepted taxonomy is based on the List of Prokaryotic names with Standing in Nomenclature (LPSN) and National Center for Biotechnology Information (NCBI).

 Phylum Spirochaetota Garrity and Holt 2021
 Class Spirochaetia Paster 2020
 Genus ?Exilispira Imachi et al. 2008
 Genus ?"Spirosymplokos" Guerrero et al. 1993
 Order Leptospirales Gupta et al. 2014
 Family Leptospiraceae Hovind-Hougen 1979
 Genus Leptonema Hovind-Hougen 1983
 Genus Leptospira Noguchi 1917
 Genus Turneriella Levett et al. 2005
 Order Brachyspirales corrig. Gupta et al. 2014
 Family Brachyspiraceae Paster 2012
 Genus Brachyspira Hovind-Hougen et al. 1982
 Genus ?"Ca. Maribrachyspira" Matsuyama et al. 2017
 Order Brevinematales Gupta et al. 2014
 Family Brevinemataceae Paster 2012
 Genus Brevinema Defosse et al. 1995
 Family "Longinemaceae" Karnachuk et al. 2021
 Genus ?"Longinema" Karnachuk et al. 2021
 Order Spirochaetales Buchanan 1917
 Family Borreliaceae Gupta et al. 2014
 Genus Borrelia Swellengrebel 1907 (relapsing fever Borrelia, Lreptile-associated Borrelia and Echidna-associated Borrelia)
 Genus Borreliella Adeolu & Gupta 2015 (yme borreliosis Borrelia)
 Genus ?Cristispira Gross 1910
 Family "Pillotinaceae" Margulis & Hinkle 1992
 Genus ?Pillotina Hollande and Gharagozlou 1967 ex Bermudes et al. 1988
 Family Sphaerochaetaceae Hördt et al. 2020
 Genus Bullifex Wylensek et al. 2021
 Genus Marispirochaeta Shivani et al. 2017
 Genus "Ca. Ornithospirochaeta" Gilroy et al. 2021
 Genus Parasphaerochaeta Bidzhieva et al. 2020
 Genus Pleomorphochaeta Arroua et al. 2016
 Genus Sediminispirochaeta Shivani et al. 2016
 Genus Sphaerochaeta Ritalahti et al. 2012
 Family Spirochaetaceae Swellengrebel 1907
 Genus ?"Canaleparolina" Wier, Ashen & Margulis 2000
 Genus ?Clevelandina Bermudes et al. 1988
 Genus ?Diplocalyx Gharagozlou 1968 ex Bermudes et al. 1988 non Richard 1850 non Presl 1845
 Genus ?Hollandina To et al. 1978 ex Bermudes et al. 1988 non Haynes 1956
 Genus ?"Mobilifilum" Margulis et al. 1990
 Genus Alkalispirochaeta Sravanthi et al. 2016
 Genus "Entomospira" Grana-Miraglia et al. 2020 non Enderlein 1917
 Genus Oceanispirochaeta Subhash & Lee 2017b
 Genus Salinispira Ben Hania et al. 2015
 Genus Spirochaeta Ehrenberg 1835 em. Pikuta et al. 2009 non Turczaninow 1851
 Genus Thiospirochaeta Dubinina et al. 2020
 Order "Treponematales" Song et al. 2021
 Family "Rectinemataceae" Song et al. 2021
 Genus Rectinema Koelschbach et al. 2017
 Family Breznakiellaceae Brune et al. 2022
 Genus Breznakiella Song et al. 2022
 Genus Gracilinema Brune et al. 2022
 Genus Helmutkoenigia Brune et al. 2022
 Genus Leadbettera Brune et al. 2022
 Genus ?Zuelzera Brune et al. 2022
 Family Treponemataceae Robinson 1948
 Genus ?"Brucepastera" Song et al. 2022
 Genus "Ca. Avitreponema" Gilroy et al. 2021
 Genus "Ca. Gallitreponema" Gilroy et al. 2021
 Genus ?"Teretinema" Song et al. 2022
 Genus Treponema Schaudinn 1905 em. Abt et al. 2013

See also 

 List of bacteria genera
 List of bacterial orders
 Bacteriology
 Borrelia
 Brevinema andersonii
 Flagellum
 Lyme disease microbiology
 Pinta (disease)
 Prokaryote
 Syphilis
 Treponema pallidum
 Yaws

References

External links 
 Introduction to the Spirochetes University of California Museum of Paleontology (UCMP)

 
Bacteria phyla